The United Nations General Assembly declared May 3 to be World Press Freedom Day  or just World Press Day, observed to raise awareness of the importance of freedom of the press and remind governments of their duty to respect and uphold the right to freedom of expression enshrined under Article 19 of the 1948 Universal Declaration of Human Rights and marking the anniversary of the Windhoek Declaration, a statement of free press principles put together by African newspaper journalists in Windhoek in 1991.

History 

In 2018, a conference sponsored by the United Nations Alliance of Civilizations was canceled. In 2018, several news organizations joined for an ad campaign. Slain journalists in Kabul were remembered.

Prizes

UNESCO marks World Press Freedom Day by conferring the UNESCO/Guillermo Cano World Press Freedom Prize on a deserving individual, organisation or institution that has made an outstanding contribution to the defence and/or promotion of press freedom anywhere in the world, especially when this has been achieved in the face of danger. Created in 1997, the prize is awarded on the recommendation of an independent jury of 14 news professionals. Names are submitted by regional and international non-governmental organisations working for press freedom, and by UNESCO member states.

The Prize is named in honour of Guillermo Cano Isaza, a Colombian journalist who was assassinated in front of the offices of his newspaper, El Espectador, in Bogotá, on 17 December 1986. Cano's writings had offended Colombia's powerful drug barons.

UNESCO conference
UNESCO also marks World Press Freedom Day each year by bringing together media professionals, press freedom organisations and UN agencies to assess the state of press freedom worldwide and discuss solutions for addressing challenges. Each conference is centred on a theme related to press freedom, including good governance, media coverage of terrorism, impunity and the role of media in post-conflict countries.

List
Source:

See also
Article 19, an international organisation
International Day to End Impunity for Crimes Against Journalists
Investigative journalism
Media transparency
Reporters Without Borders
World Association of Newspapers and News Publishers

Notes and References

Notes

References

External links

UN World Press Freedom Day
UNESCO World Press Freedom Day
UNESCO World Press Freedom Day 2014

Events relating to freedom of expression
Journalism
May observances
UNESCO
Press Freedom Day, World
Freedom of the press
Articles containing video clips